Greg Zanis (November 27, 1950May 4, 2020) was an American carpenter who is most well known for building and delivering personalized crosses (and some Stars of David and crescents) to shooting victims across the United States.

Early life
Zanis was born in Spokane, Washington, and grew up in Nashville to a father who was a Greek Orthodox priest, and a mother who was a Greek immigrant and worked as a seamstress. The family spoke Greek at home.

Crosses for Losses
The first cross that Zanis (by this time, a resident of Aurora, Illinois) built was for his own father-in-law, a murder victim. Shortly after the 1999 Columbine High School massacre, Zanis constructed 15 crosses (thirteen for the victims and two for the shooters, Eric Harris and Dylan Klebold) and delivered them to a park near the site of the shooting. The two crosses for Harris and Klebold were soon cut down by the father of one of the shooting victims.

Since that time, Zanis built and delivered over 26,000 crosses, some with Stars of David and some crescents to sites of mass shootings and natural disasters across the United States. He later founded an organization to raise funds for this effort, called "Crosses for Losses". During that time, he kept handwritten notebooks of the names of the victims for whom he built memorials.

Personal life
In late 2019, Zanis was diagnosed with bladder cancer. He made arrangements to transfer the activities of his organization to the Lutheran Church Charities ministry of the Lutheran Church–Missouri Synod. He died while in hospice in Naperville, Illinois on May 4, 2020, at age 69.

References

External links

1950 births
2020 deaths
People from Seattle
American carpenters
People from Aurora, Illinois
Mass shootings in the United States
Christians from Illinois
American people of Greek descent
Deaths from bladder cancer
Deaths from cancer in Illinois
Memorial crosses